The J. S. Seaverns was a cargo ship that was built August, 1880 in Saugatuck, Michigan and sank May 10, 1884 in Lake Superior near Michipicoten, Ontario.

The Seaverns sank during calm weather. As she was backing away from the dock, the struck a rock and began taking on water. Because of the calm water, she went down on an even keel. There was no loss of life.

The cold freshwater of Lake Superior helped to preserve the wreck. Its anchors are still on the deck. The wreck is within scuba diving depths.

References

Maritime incidents in May 1884
1880 ships